Liliana Lewińska (born 2 November 2008 in Wroclaw) is a Polish rhythmic gymnast. Individual Polish Junior Champion in 2022 and 2021. Team Polish Junior Champion 2022 and silver medal of the Polish team championship as UKS Kopernik Wrocław. She represents her country in international competitions.

Personal life 
Lewińska is the daughter of Krystyna Leskiewicz, 1996 Olympian who's her current coach. She has a three years younger sister, Laura, also a rhythmic gymnast.

Career

Junior 
She debuted into major competitions at the 2021 international tournament in Moscow in February, winning bronze in the All-Around, 5th with hoop, ball, clubs and 12th with ribbon. In April he participated to the Sofia Cup in Bulgaria, topping the All-Around, she started to be a known name in the rhythmic gymnastics world. In May she came second in the All-Around and ball, and 3rd with clubs and topping hoop at the Irina Deleanu cup in Bucharest. In September she shone at the Gydnia Cup.

In 2022 she returned to the Moscow Grand Prix winning silver in all events. She won the All-Around at the Gydnia Cup, doing the same in all the apparatus finals except hoop, where she finished in 2nd. The following week she attended the World Challenge Cup in Portimão, getting bronze with hoop, silver with clubs and gold with ribbon. Liliana was then selected for the 2022 European Championship in Tel Aviv, Israel, she was the only junior gymnast representing Poland in the competition, she nonetheless managed to qualify for all four event finals and won two silvers with hoop and clubs and bronze with ribbon.

Routine music information

References

External links
 

2008 births
Living people
Polish rhythmic gymnasts

Medalists at the Rhythmic Gymnastics European Championships